Sheil is an unincorporated community in Ralls County, in the U.S. state of Missouri.

History
Variant names were "Shiel" and "Sidney". A post office operated under the name "Sidney" as early as 1855. The name was changed to "" in 1898, and the post office was discontinued in 1910. Shiel was named after a local priest.

References

Unincorporated communities in Ralls County, Missouri
Unincorporated communities in Missouri